Provincial road N331 (N331) is a road connecting Rijksweg 6 (A6) and N351 in Emmeloord with European route E232 (E 232) / A6 and N337 in Zwolle.

Major intersections

External links

331
331
331